Anilios ammodytes, also known as the sand-diving blind snake, is a species of blind snake that is endemic to Australia. The specific epithet ammodytes (“sand-diver”) refers to the snake's habits and habitat.

Description
The species is a small, thin and pale blind snake. It grows to an average of about 25 cm in length.

Behaviour
The species is oviparous.

Distribution and habitat
The snake is found in the Pilbara region of Western Australia. The type locality is Hermite Island in the Montebello Islands off the Pilbara coast.

References

ammodytes
Snakes of Australia
Reptiles of Western Australia
Reptiles described in 1914